Jitka Seitlová (born 17 April 1954) is a Czech politician and current senator for Přerov District, a position which she has held since 2014. She also served for the same district between 1996 and 2007. She won in the 1996 Czech Senate election, ahead of ODS candidate Stanislav Žalud. In November 2020, she was elected as deputy speaker (Vice-President) of the Senate.

References

External links 
 

1954 births
Living people
People from Přerov
Members of the Senate of the Czech Republic
Civic Democratic Alliance Senators
KDU-ČSL Senators
20th-century Czech women politicians
20th-century Czech politicians
21st-century Czech politicians
21st-century Czech women politicians
Masaryk University alumni
Czech geologists